is the extension of the shinjitai (officially simplified kanji). They are unofficial characters; the official forms of these hyōgaiji are still kyūjitai (traditional characters).

Simplified forms 
When the 1,850 character-long tōyō kanji list was produced in 1949, many characters were simplified from their original forms, and the new simpler forms became the standard kanji used in Japanese writing. In addition, the character , which had already been included during the formation of the tōyō kanji list, became .

However, as a result of adopting simplified characters, kanji that shared the same structural elements (radicals or other phono-semantic compounds) were not all simplified in the same way.
This problem arose from reforming only the most common characters rather than decomposing all characters into radicals and other constructs. This was done systematically for simplified Chinese characters, although even in there many exceptions to the rule exist.

Creation of extended shinjitai 
The Asahi Shimbun newspaper developed its own script known as Asahi characters, which applied the rationale of simplification to characters other than jōyō kanji. In this script, the right element of the three aforementioned unsimplified characters (and ) were all simplified to 売. Characters that were simplified in this way are called extended shinjitai, as simplification was extended to characters outside of the jōyō kanji list.

Extended shinjitai was also implemented into JIS kanji.

JIS X 0208, created in 1983, was the first JIS character set to extensively use extended shinjitai, adopting simplifications for a large number of previously unsimplified characters. Simplified forms had never been used in printing these characters prior to this reform. However, the character set became subject to criticism when it was revealed that the character  in the name "" (Mori Ōgai, a famous Japanese poet and novelist) could only be represented in word processors in its simplified form.

 Characters marked * are environment-dependent characters.

Reduction of extended shinjitai 
Established in 1990, the JIS X 0212 set of auxiliary characters supplemented the previous character set by including both the traditional and simplified forms of certain characters. However, usage of these auxiliary characters in the Shift JIS computer encoding was not taken into consideration, and most word processors remained unable to display these traditional characters. The Japanese Language Council meeting of 1992 confirmed the need for a unified character set that could be used in all computers and word processors.

In December of the same year, the Japanese Language Council compiled a list of 22 widely used extended shinjitai (kan'ikanyōjitai) and approved their use in place of their traditional variants in print.

JIS X 0213-2004 (released in 2004) made minor modifications to the script, changing character shapes and strokes. For characters that are not in the jōyō kanji list, the shinnyō radical was changed from having a single dot into a double-dot variant. The Windows Vista operating system, released in January 2007, conformed to these modifications, but confusion resulted in cases where the single dot was automatically changed to double dots in, for instance, surnames written using the character .

The Asahi Shimbun newspaper also modified its characters to conform to the new standards, and altered their Asahi characters in January 2007.

In the latest 2010 jōyō reform, taking the aforementioned  radical as an example, the previous logic of one-dot corresponding to jōyō and two-dot to non-jōyō was eliminated, as for instance  ("riddle") is now a jōyō kanji.

Nevertheless, the 2010 guidelines by the Japanese government also explicitly allow simplification in handwriting and do not object to use of alternate characters in electronic text, likely in recognition of established technical standards.

References

See also 
Shinjitai
Japanese script reform
List of hyōgai kanji ja.Wiktionary 

Kanji
Japanese writing system terms
Japanese writing system